Şerefligöközü is a village in the District of Haymana, Ankara Province, Turkey.

References 

Villages in Haymana District
Kurdish settlements in Ankara Province